Chi lavora è perduto (also known as In capo al mondo) is a 1963 Italian drama film directed by Tinto Brass.

In 2008 the film was selected to enter the list of the 100 Italian films to be saved.

Plot
The film follows a day of Bonifacio (Sady Rebbot), a young and unemployed designer with anti-social tendencies. He has applied at a job and has an interview for the psychological test in the morning. The rest of the day, he starts to roam around Venice and recalls his past, also having daydreams about his future. Flashbacks reveal his troubled love affair with his former girlfriend Gabriella (Pascale Audret) and his relationships with his communist friends Claudio (Tino Buazzelli) and 'Kim' (Franco Arcalli).

Cast 
 Sady Rebbot - Bonifacio
 Pascale Audret - Gabriella
 Tino Buazzelli - Claudio
 Franco Arcalli - Kim
 Nando Angelini - Sergeant
 
 Gino Cavalieri
 Piero Vida - Friend of Bonifacio
 Monique Messine

References

External links

1963 films
Italian drama films
1963 drama films
Films directed by Tinto Brass
Films set in Venice
Films set in Switzerland
1960s Italian films